Coleophora paragiraudi is a moth of the family Coleophoridae which is found in Iran.

References

paragiraudi
Moths of the Middle East
Moths described in 1959